Bastipur can refer to:

 Bastipur, Janakpur, Nepal
 Bastipur, Sagarmatha, Nepal
 Bastipur, India, Bihar, India

See also
 Bastepur, Ranga Reddy district, Andhra Pradesh, India